Years Later...A Few Months After is the fourth and final  studio album by  rapper Soulja Slim released exactly 3 months before his death. It was released on Koch Records.

Track listing

References

2003 albums
Soulja Slim albums
E1 Music albums